Heterocloeon is a genus of small minnow mayflies in the family Baetidae. There are about nine described species in Heterocloeon.

Species
These nine species belong to the genus Heterocloeon:
 Heterocloeon amplum (Traver, 1932) i c g b
 Heterocloeon anoka (Daggy, 1945) c g
 Heterocloeon berneri (Müller-Liebenau, 1974) i c g
 Heterocloeon curiosum (McDunnough, 1923) i c g b
 Heterocloeon davidi Waltz & McCafferty, 2005 c g
 Heterocloeon frivolum (McDunnough, 1925) i c g
 Heterocloeon grande (Wiersema and Long, 2000) i c g
 Heterocloeon petersi (Müller-Liebenau, 1974) i c g b
 Heterocloeon rubrolaterale (McDunnough, 1931) c g
Data sources: i = ITIS, c = Catalogue of Life, g = GBIF, b = Bugguide.net

References

 
 
 
 
 
 
 

Mayfly genera